This is a list of museums in Moscow, the capital city of Russia

List

See also 

List of Moscow tourist attractions
List of museums in Russia
List of museums in Saint Petersburg

References

Museums
 List_of_museums
Moscow
Moscow
Moscow